Huntington Council  may be:

Huntington Council (New York)
Huntington Council (West Virginia)